This is a list of schools of the Roman Catholic Diocese of Gallup, in New Mexico and Arizona.

Schools
 Arizona
 St. Michael Indian School (K-12), St. Michaels
 St. Anthony School (K-8), Show Low
 Circa 2009 it covered to grade 4. As of that time it was adding the 5th grade the following year and adding another grade each year until grade 8.
 Immaculate Heart of Mary Preschool, Page

 New Mexico
 Sacred Heart School, Farmington
 It was established in 1910.
 Sacred Heart School, Gallup
 In 2020 the diocese sold the former building to Hozho Academy, a charter school. In 2020 the diocese had plans to build a new school facility, located on the property of Sacred Heart Cathedral.
 St. Anthony School, Zuni Pueblo
 The school began operations on September 3, 1923. The Sisters of Saint Francis of Perpetual Adoration operated the school. Its initial enrollment was 43.
 St. Bonaventure Indian School, Thoreau - K-8, but was K-12 from 1986 to 2001
 St. Francis of Assisi School, Lumberton
 St. Joseph School, San Fidel
 St. Teresa of Avila School, Grants
 The school building opened in 1945.
 St. Francis Preschool, Gallup

Former schools
 Gallup Catholic School (K-12), Gallup, New Mexico  (High school closed in 2013)
 Immaculate Conception School, Cuba, New Mexico
 St. Francis of Assisi School, Gallup, New Mexico

References

Gallup
Gallup
New Mexico
Gallup Roman Catholic
Private schools in Arizona
Private schools in New Mexico